Dvornikov is a Russian surname. Notable people with the name include:

Aleksandr Vladimirovich Dvornikov, (born 1961), Russian general
Fyodor Andreyevich Dvornikov, (born 1992), Russian football player

Russian-language surnames